William Ismael da Silva Ferreira or simply William Ismael (born 9 February 1989 in São Paulo) is a Brazilian professional footballer who plays as a central defender. He was under contract to Corinthians from 2 May 2006 to 30 April 2009, and made five first-team appearances in 2006.

References

1989 births
Living people
Footballers from São Paulo
Brazilian footballers
Association football defenders
Sport Club Corinthians Paulista players